Arlene Stein is an American sociologist and author best known for her writing about sex and gender, the politics of identities, and collective memory. She is Distinguished professor of sociology at Rutgers University where she directs the Rutgers University Institute for Research on Women. Stein has also taught at the University of Essex and at the University of Oregon.

Early life and education
Stein grew up in New York City and graduated from the Bronx High School of Science. She attended Amherst College from which she received her BA in History in 1980. She studied at University of California, Berkeley where she obtained an MA in 1985 and a PhD in sociology in 1993. Stein identifies as a lesbian. She is the daughter of Holocaust survivors from Poland.

Scholarship
Stein's work explores intersections among personal and political change, particularly how marginalized and traumatized people narrate experiences. Stein draws on feminist theory, symbolic interactionism, psychoanalytic theory, and queer theory. She employs interviewing and ethnographic research methods. Her 1997 Sex and Sensibility traces accounts by women engaged in feminist and gay/lesbian movements noting challenges to the culturally dominant medical definitions of lesbianism. Stein's 2018 Unbound explores new varieties of masculinity that challenge feminist notions of gender. The Stranger Next Door focuses on a town in the United States Pacific Northwest that passed a ballot initiative designed to outlaw gay/lesbian rights. Stein establishes that opposition to LGBT rights in the United States became a way to constitute Christian fundamentalism, and illustrates ways that conservative social movements construct knowledge and shape public opinion about sexuality. Reluctant Witnesses examines the rise of Holocaust consciousness in the United States. It draws on interviews and participant observation with Holocaust survivors and their children to describe how the Holocaust became widely discussed and understood.

Awards
Stein received the American Anthropological Association's Ruth Benedict Prize in 2001 for her second monograph, The Stranger Next Door: The Story of a Small Community’s Battle over Sex, Faith, and Civil Rights. In 2006, Stein received the American Sociological Association Simon and Gagnon Lifetime Achievement Award for her career contribution to the study of sexualities.

Other publications

References 

Living people
American sociologists
American women sociologists
Lesbian academics
Rutgers University faculty
University of California, Berkeley alumni
Amherst College alumni
Year of birth missing (living people)
21st-century American LGBT people
21st-century American women